Deerhead is an unincorporated community in Barber County, Kansas, United States.

History
A post office in Deerhead was established in 1885, closed temporarily in 1894, reopened in 1895, and closed permanently in 1923.

Geography

Climate
The climate in this area is characterized by hot, humid summers and generally mild to cool winters.  According to the Köppen Climate Classification system, Deerhead has a humid subtropical climate, abbreviated "Cfa" on climate maps.

References

Further reading

External links
 Barber County maps: Current, Historic, KDOT

Unincorporated communities in Barber County, Kansas
Unincorporated communities in Kansas